Adam J. Berinsky (born 1970) is a professor of political science at the Massachusetts Institute of Technology. He is the author of the 2004 book Silent Voices: Public Opinion and Political Participation in America and the 2009 book In Time of War: Understanding Public Opinion, From World War II to Iraq.

A graduate of Hunter College High School in New York City, he completed his undergraduate education at Wesleyan University and received his Ph.D. from The University of Michigan, Ann Arbor from the Department of Political Science in 2000.

In 2013, Berinsky received the Warren J. Mitofsky Award for Excellence in Public Opinion Research from the Board of Directors of the Roper Center for Public Opinion Research at Cornell University.

In 2016 the Finnish government hired him to train their staff in countering Russian disinformation.

References

External links
Adam J. Berinsky — MIT page
 with The Young Turks

Wesleyan University alumni
MIT School of Humanities, Arts, and Social Sciences faculty
University of Michigan College of Literature, Science, and the Arts alumni
American male writers
1970 births
Hunter College High School alumni
Living people
American political scientists